Chrysiptera taupou, known commonly as the southseas devil, southseas demoiselle, and Fiji damsel, is a species of damselfish. It is native to the western Pacific Ocean from the Coral Sea to Samoa.

Description
This fish reaches about 8 centimeters in length.

Biology
Habitat types include reefs and lagoons. The fish pairs up to breed and the male guards and tends the eggs.

Uses
The fish has value as a specimen in public aquaria.

In aquarium
It is very aggressive to other small fishes especially damsel and clown fishes. It is recommended to raise them in the large fish tank.

References

External links
 

taupou
Taxa named by David Starr Jordan
Taxa named by Alvin Seale
Fish described in 1906